SMMU may refer to:

 Second Military Medical University, China
 System Memory Management Unit, an IOMMU by ARM
 Smack My Marine Up, in the List of Doom source ports
 PIMCO Short Term Muni Bond Strategy ETF (NYSE Arca code: SMMU); See List of American exchange-traded funds
 SMMU, a force of the Austrian Armed Forces

See also
 Santa Monica-Malibu Unified School District (SMMUSD), US
 Stefano Moshi Memorial University College (SMMUCo), Tanzania